David Allan Stewart (born 9 September 1952) is an English musician, songwriter and record producer, best known for Eurythmics, his successful professional partnership with Annie Lennox. Sometimes credited as David A. Stewart, he won Best British Producer at the 1986, 1987 and 1990 Brit Awards. Stewart (along with Lennox) was inducted into the Songwriters Hall of Fame in 2020 and the duo were inducted into the Rock and Roll Hall of Fame in 2022. Outside of Eurythmics, Stewart has written and produced songs for artists such as Ringo Starr, Stevie Nicks, Mick Jagger and Tom Petty.

Early life
Stewart was born in Sunderland, England, in 1952 and he attended Barnes Infants and Junior School and Bede Grammar School for Boys. Whilst still in his teens, he secured a record deal as part of folk-rock band Longdancer. Despite being signed to Elton John's record label, The Rocket Record Company, they did not achieve commercial success. He also collaborated with Brian Harrison to produce an EP on the Sunderland Multicord label (label number MULT-SH-1, producer Ken McKenzie), recording two songs ("Girl" and "Green She Said") from a school musical production written by teacher Dick Bradshaw, one traditional number ("A Blacksmith Courted Me") and a song written by Dave and Brian ("Deep December"). After leaving Wearside Stewart spent several years living in squats in London. In late 1976, he was introduced to Annie Lennox by Paul Jacobs. Soon, Stewart and Lennox became romantically involved. By 1977, the pair had teamed up with Sunderland musician Peet Coombes, releasing a single on Logo Records as The Catch. The band then developed into The Tourists who enjoyed modest success, including a hit in 1979 with a cover of the Dusty Springfield hit "I Only Want to Be with You".

Eurythmics 

The Tourists split up in 1980, as did Stewart and Lennox, though the pair continued to work together. They formed a new musical project named Eurythmics. After a string of hit singles and albums, the duo split in 1990, but reunited in 1999 for the album Peace and another world tour. Lennox and Stewart worked together again in 2005, recording two new tracks for the greatest hits package Ultimate Collection, released to coincide with Eurythmics' 25th anniversary.

Post-Eurythmics

When Eurythmics dissolved in 1990, Stewart moved to France and immediately released an album with his new band, The Spiritual Cowboys. The song "Party Town" was featured in the 1990 film Flatliners. A second album followed in 1991. Both records went Gold in France, where Stewart concentrated his efforts.
 
In 1992, Stewart collaborated with singer Terry Hall (formerly of The Specials, The Fun Boy Three and The Colourfield) on the project Vegas. The duo released one self-titled album but this was commercially unsuccessful, though one of the singles from the album ("Possessed") made the UK Top 40.

In 1993, Stewart appeared in an Apple Inc. advertisement for the Power Macintosh in which he riffed on the word "power". He also had a small cameo as a computer hacker in the 1995 film Hackers.

In 1994, Stewart released a solo album, Greetings from the Gutter. The album was not a commercial success, though Stewart scored a minor UK hit with the single "Heart Of Stone" which reached number 36. He then released another album, Sly-Fi, first on the internet.

In 1995, Stewart appeared in an advert for BT in which he sung the track 'Secrets' which was made specifically for BT to be used in the advert.

In 1997, Stewart released an album Come Alive with the actress and singer Rhona Mitra. In 1999, he produced a second album, Female Icon.

In November 2002, Stewart worked with former South African president Nelson Mandela. Stewart came up with the idea of turning Mandela's prison number into a telephone number then wrote and recorded songs with Paul McCartney, Bono and Edge and various others that you could only hear if you dialled this number and whilst listening you were donating. He then began organising the 46664 campaign and series of concerts in the fight against HIV/AIDS in South Africa.

In 2007, Stewart announced on his MySpace page that he would be playing live concerts showcasing his entire career. According to the announcement, he was to be accompanied by various guest musicians as well as a 30-piece orchestra. Additionally, Stewart has stated that for the first time in many years, he has been writing new songs on his guitar, although he had no plans at that time for a new solo album.

On the project, The Dave Stewart Songbook, he wrote a large coffee table-size book full of stories and photographs and also re-recorded 21 hit songs which have been co-written or co-produced by him during the past decades and were originally released by artists such as No Doubt, Shakespears Sister, Bryan Ferry, Celine Dion, Bob Geldof, Tom Petty and the Heartbreakers, Jon Bon Jovi and Eurythmics. Also included is the song "American Prayer" written by Stewart with Bono of U2, for which Dave Stewart shot a video clip in support of the campaign of US presidential candidate Barack Obama, featuring various film and music stars, which premiered on YouTube on 23 August 2008. Stewart also released a new solo track, Let's Do It Again, in 2008. In July 2010, Stewart recorded his first solo album of new material since 1998's Sly-Fi. Entitled The Blackbird Diaries, it was recorded in Nashville, Tennessee, and includes duets with Stevie Nicks, Martina McBride, Colbie Caillat and The Secret Sisters. Stewart has made a film of the making of the album and also filmed a live concert in Nashville at The Belcourt Theatre on 9 December 2010.

In May 2011 it was announced that Mick Jagger of the Rolling Stones had formed a new supergroup called SuperHeavy which includes Dave Stewart, Joss Stone, Damian Marley and A. R. Rahman.

In May 2012 it was announced that Stewart would be playing four UK shows in September 2012 to support the release of his new album The Ringmaster General.

In 2013, Stewart released "Lucky Numbers" which was recorded on a boat in the South Pacific for 12 days

In 2016, Stewart teamed up with New Zealand singer Jon Stevens and the duo recorded an album called Starlight. which was released in March 2017 and features a blues and soul influenced rock / powerpop sound.
Parallel to that, Stewart also co-wrote and produced a new studio album with Australian singer Vanessa Amorosi, which features "soul gospel" music and also is scheduled for release, possibly in 2018.

In October 2017 Stewart appeared on a German TV programme marking the 40th year of the stage career of the German singer Nena with whom he performed their jointly written track, "Be My Rebel".

Other projects

Writer and producer
Stewart produced or co-produced all of Eurythmics' albums and, once the band became established, he also became a producer of other artists. In 1985, as well as producing Eurythmics' hit album Be Yourself Tonight, Stewart co-produced the album Southern Accents for Tom Petty and the Heartbreakers, as well as co-writing several songs for the album including the hit "Don't Come Around Here No More". The same year, Stewart also produced the debut solo album by Feargal Sharkey, which included the UK number one hit "A Good Heart". Due to these accomplishments, Stewart won "Best Producer" at the 1986 BRIT Awards in London.

Stewart would go on to write and produce for a variety of other artists throughout the years. In 1986, he collaborated with Bob Geldof on tracks for his debut solo album Deep in the Heart of Nowhere. Working together, the duo named themselves "The Brothers of Doom". Also in 1986, he co-produced the album Three Hearts in the Happy Ending Machine by Daryl Hall. The same year, he co-wrote and produced the song "Is This Love?" by Alison Moyet, a UK number 3.

Stewart also co-wrote and co-produced several tracks for Mick Jagger's 1987 album Primitive Cool.

In 1989, Stewart produced the debut album by Russian singer-songwriter Boris Grebenshchikov, Radio Silence.

In 1992, along with Marcella Detroit, he co-wrote the Shakespears Sister hit single "Stay" with his then-wife, Siobhan Fahey (with Stewart credited under the pseudonym "Jean Guiot") as well as several other tracks for their second album Hormonally Yours. In this year Fahey also provided vocals on "Walk into the Wind" for Stewart's group Vegas with Terry Hall, Olle Romö and Emmanuel 'Manu' Guiot.

In 1993, Stewart co-wrote two tracks for German punk rock-singer Nina Hagen which were published on her sixth solo studio album Revolution Ballroom. He can also be heard on keyboards and contributed background vocals.

In 1996, Stewart produced the debut album by Alisha's Attic, Alisha Rules the World, and wrote a few tracks on the third Shakespears Sister album #3 (actually a solo album by Siobhan Fahey, which Fahey ended up releasing in 2004).

In 1997, Stewart co-produced the album Destination Anywhere for Jon Bon Jovi, and also co-wrote two tracks.

Stewart collaborated with Bryan Ferry on his 2002 album Frantic, co-writing several tracks and co-producing one of them.

He also co-wrote "Friend or Foe" for the Russian pop duo t.A.T.u., which is on their 2005 album Dangerous and Moving.

In 2008, Stewart was brought in by Ringo Starr to produce his album Liverpool 8, after Starr dismissed the album's original producer, Mark Hudson. Hudson's work on some tracks earned both Stewart and Hudson credits as co-producers (along with Starr himself).

In 2010, Stewart announced on his Twitter account he was co-writing and producing the new studio album by Stevie Nicks. The album, entitled In Your Dreams, was co-produced by Glen Ballard and released in May 2011.

In 2010, Stewart co-wrote and co-produced two songs with writer and composer Mark Warford 'Lover Earth' and 'Time, Faith, Love' for the charity-focused dramatised audio production, 'A Voyage For Soldier Miles'.

On 24 February 2011, Stewart tweeted that he had just produced a new album by Joss Stone, stating that they also wrote 10 songs together.

On 10 October 2011, Stewart released a new song called "Leap of faith" in collaboration with Greek singer Anna Vissi. The official clip of the song was released in Anna's fan club YouTube channel. Two days later, the Stewart produced Fire EP for artist Orianthi was released as an iTunes download.

He has worked occasionally with American ska-punk band No Doubt, co-writing "Underneath It All" for their 2001 release Rock Steady and "Sparkle" for their 2012 release Push and Shove.

In 2013, he worked with singer Lauren Harris on the pop rock project Kingdom of I. The track Crying at the Disco was released as a free download on Soundcloud later that year.

Film, television and soundtrack work
Though he co-wrote the theme song for the 1986 comedy Ruthless People with Mick Jagger and Daryl Hall, Stewart took a greater involvement in the film industry in 1989 by writing and producing the soundtrack Lily Was Here for the Dutch film De Kassière (English title Lily Was Here). The single, also called "Lily Was Here" and featuring saxophone player Candy Dulfer, topped the Dutch charts for five weeks. The single also reached the UK Top 10 and peaked at No. 11 on the Billboard Hot 100 in the summer of 1990.

Though he had previously directed music videos, he made his feature film directorial debut in 2000 with Honest, a black comedy set in Swinging London in the late 1960s featuring three members of the British girl group All Saints.

Stewart also performed the song "Everybody, All Over The World (Join The Celebration)" for the 2004 film Around the World in 80 Days.

Stewart, in conjunction with his brother John J. Stewart of Oil Factory Productions, and in collaboration with music critic and author Robert Palmer and documentary filmmaker Robert Mugge made a documentary dealing with Delta Blues music. Deep Blues: A Musical Pilgrimage to the Crossroads, released in 1991, was filmed in Memphis, Tennessee and various north Mississippi counties. Palmer narrated.

Stewart was the main interviewer for the HBO series Off the Record, which is a show that highlights songwriting and features prominent musicians. The pilot aired on HBO on 24 November 2006 and featured Bono and The Edge from U2.

He collaborated with Mick Jagger to record songs which appear on the soundtrack to the movie Alfie, released in 2004. The soundtrack includes the critically acclaimed song "Old Habits Die Hard", which won a Golden Globe award for Best Original Song from a Motion Picture.

In 2010 the song Love Lives, originally from the 2009 EP Let's Do It Again, is included in the soundtrack of the movie Repo Men.

In 2012, together with Rosemary Reed, Stewart was the executive co-producer of Living The Life series on Sky Arts. He also recorded an exclusive soundtrack for the new episodes.

Stewart is the co-creator and executive producer of the 2012 ABC sitcom Malibu Country starring Reba McEntire.

Stewart co-created and voiced several characters on the Adult Swim original series Mr. Pickles. His roles have so far included that of Mr. Pickles, Floyd, Linda, Dispatch and Deer Hunter #2. He also played Dispatch on the spin-off Momma Named Me Sheriff beginning in 2019. 

Stewart created and executive produces the NBC unscripted series Songland, which gives new songwriters a chance to have their original compositions recorded by an established artist, with a single released immediately following each episode. The panel of judges on Songland include Ryan Tedder, Ester Dean and Shane McAnally. The series premiered in the summer of 2019 and averaged 5.1 million viewers per episode, the most for a new unscripted series that summer. NBC announced that the series had been renewed for a second season in September 2019.

Musical theatre
Stewart wrote the musical Barbarella, based on the 1968 film, which premiered in Vienna on 11 March 2004. Stewart wrote music and lyrics (with Glen Ballard) for Ghost the Musical, which opened at the Piccadilly Theatre in London's West End in June 2011.

Record label
Though most of Stewart's own music (specifically with Eurythmics) was released via the RCA/BMG label, he also formed his own record label in the 1980s called Anxious Records. The label has included a roster of artists such as Terry Hall, Londonbeat, Chris Braide and Curve vocalist Toni Halliday.

Platinum Weird

In 2006, Stewart resurrected Platinum Weird, a band he purportedly formed in the early 1970s in London with singer Erin Grace, but which was in reality created in 2004. According to the fictional account, Erin was moody and mysterious, and disappeared shortly before the band's eponymous album was due to be released in 1974. Platinum Weird features noted songwriter Kara DioGuardi on vocals and the band has re-recorded some of the fictional original band's songs and some new ones as well for an upcoming album. The album was produced by John Shanks.

In July 2006, VH1 premiered a mockumentary entitled Rock Legends – Platinum Weird, an examination of the band's unusual story, complete with cameo appearances from such rock legends as Mick Jagger, Annie Lennox, Ringo Starr and Elton John, all reminiscing about the former band's short-lived heyday and their impressions of the mysterious Erin Grace. The album was further promoted by a series of bogus World Wide Web fan sites, some of which are registered by the New Media Department of Interscope Records and hosted on the same server as interscope.com, and related false documents for the "lost" group.

Bibliography
Walk-In (2006); Virgin Comics
Zombie Broadway (2008); Virgin Comics
 The Dave Stewart Songbook: The Stories Behind the Songs; September, 2008; Surfdog; 
 The Business Playground: Where Creativity and Commerce Collide; with Mark Simmons; July, 2010; New Riders; 
Sweet Dreams are Made of This: A Life in Music; February, 2016; Penguin;

Personal life 
Previously married from 1972 to 1977 to Pamela Wilkinson, Stewart married former Bananarama member Siobhan Fahey (who later formed Shakespears Sister) in 1987. The couple have two children (Sam and Django). They divorced in 1996. On 4 August 2001, Stewart married Dutch photographer Anoushka Fisz, with whom he has two daughters, Kaya and Indya. In 2004, Stewart and Fisz moved to Hollywood so Stewart could concentrate on his soundtrack work. They renewed their marriage vows in 2013.

He is a Sunderland A.F.C. supporter and still watches their games. As a child, his ambition was to play for the club.

Awards and recognition
In 2000, Stewart received the O2 Silver Clef Award. He was inducted into the UK Music Hall of Fame in 2005, and won the Music Producers Guild Outstanding Contribution to UK Music Award in 2015. Eurythmics were nominated for the Rock and Roll Hall of Fame in 2017. Eurythmics were successfully inducted into said Rock & Roll Hall of Fame in 2022.

Grammy Awards

|-
| style="text-align:center;" |1983||style="text-align:left;" |Eurythmics|| Best New Artist|| 
|-
| style="text-align:center;" |1984||style="text-align:left;" |Sweet Dreams (Video album) || Grammy Award for Best Music VideoLong Form|| 
|-
| style="text-align:center;" rowspan="2"| 1985||style="text-align:left;| "Would I Lie to You?" || Best Rock Performance by Group or Duo with Vocal ||
|-
| style="text-align:left;|"Sisters Are Doin' It for Themselves"|| Best R&B Performance by a Group or Duo with Vocal || 
|-
| style="text-align:center;" |1986 ||style="text-align:left;" |"Missionary Man"|| Best Rock Performance by a Group or Duo with Vocal|| 
|-
| style="text-align:center;" |1989 ||style="text-align:left;" | "Savage" || Grammy Award for Best Music VideoLong Form||
|-
| style="text-align:center;" |1990||style="text-align:left;" | "We Too Are One" ||Grammy Award for Best Music Video  Long Form||
|}

Brit Awards

|-
| style="text-align:center;" |1984||style="text-align:left;" | Eurythmics||Best British Group||
|-
| style="text-align:center;" rowspan="3" |1986||style="text-align:left;" | Eurythmics||Best British Group||
|-
|style="text-align:left;" |Be Yourself Tonight (Eurythmics)||Best British Album||
|-
|style="text-align:left;" | Stewart ||British Producer of the Year||
|-
| style="text-align:center;" rowspan="2" |1987||style="text-align:left;" | Eurythmics||Best British Group||
|-
|style="text-align:left;" | Stewart ||British Producer of the Year||
|-
| style="text-align:center;" rowspan="4" |1990||style="text-align:left;" | Eurythmics||Best British Group||
|-
|style="text-align:left;" |We Too Are One (Eurythmics)||Best British Album||
|-
|style="text-align:left;" | Stewart ||British Producer of the Year||
|-
|style="text-align:left;" | "Don't Ask Me Why" (Eurythmics)||Best British Video||
|-
|style="text-align:center;" |1992||style="text-align:left;" | Stewart||Producer of the Year||
|-
| style="text-align:center;" |1999||style="text-align:left;" | Eurythmics||Outstanding Contribution to Music||
|}

Ivor Novello Awards

|-
|style="text-align:center;" |1984||style="text-align:left;" |Lennox and Stewart||Songwriters of the Year||
|-
| style="text-align:center;" rowspan="2" |1987||style="text-align:left;" |"It's Alright (Baby's Coming Back)" (Eurythmics)||Best Contemporary Song|| 
|-
|style="text-align:left;" |Lennox and Stewart||Songwriters of the Year||
-
|}

Film, publishing and soundtrack awards

|-
|style="text-align:center;" |2003||style="text-align:left;" |"Underneath It All"||BMI London Awards, Song of the Year||
|-
| style="text-align:center;" |2004||style="text-align:left;"| "Old Habits Die Hard" from AlfieStewart with Mick Jagger|| Best Song, Las Vegas Film Critics Award||
|- 
| style="text-align:center;" rowspan="3" |2005||style="text-align:left;" |  "Old Habits Die Hard" from AlfieStewart with Mick Jagger||Best Song, Critics Choice Awards||
|-
|style="text-align:left;" | "Old Habits Die Hard" from AlfieStewart with Mick Jagger||Golden Globe Award for Best Song||
|-
|style="text-align:left;" | "Old Habits Die Hard" from AlfieStewart with Mick Jagger|| World Soundtrack Award for Best Original Song Written Directly for a Film ||
|-
|}

MTV Video Music Awards

|-
| style="text-align:center;" |1984||style="text-align:left;" |"Sweet Dreams"||Best New Artist||
|-
| style="text-align:center;" |1985||style="text-align:left;" | "Would I Lie to You?||Five nominations, including Best Group||
|-
| style="text-align:center;" |1987||style="text-align:left;" | "Missionary Man" ||Five nominations, including Best Group||
|-
|style="text-align:center;"rowspan="2" |1988||style="text-align:left;" |"You Have Placed A Chill in My Heart"|| Best Direction||
|-
|style="text-align:left;" |"I Need A Man" || Best Group || 
|}

Discography

Studio albums

Singles

Collaborations 
With Ringo Starr
 Liverpool 8 (Capitol Records, 2008)
 Y Not (Universal Music Enterprises, 2010)
 Ringo 2012 (Universal Music Enterprises, 2012)
 Postcards from Paradise (Universal Music Enterprises, 2015)
 Give More Love (Universal Music Enterprises, 2017)
 What's My Name (Universal Music Enterprises, 2019)

With Robin Zander
 Robin Zander (Interscope Records, 1993)

With Joss Stone
 LP1 (Surfdog Records, 2011)
 Never Forget My Love (Bay Street, 2022)

With Daryl Hall
 Three Hearts in the Happy Ending Machine (RCA Records, 1986)

With Nina Hagen
 Revolution Ballroom (Mercury Records, 1993)

With Geri Halliwell
 Scream If You Wanna Go Faster (EMI, 2001)

With Jon Bon Jovi
 Destination Anywhere (Mercury Records, 1997)

With Billy Ray Cyrus
 Back to Tennessee (Lyric Street, 2009)

With Tom Petty and the Heartbreakers
 Southern Accents (MCA Records, 1985)

With Orianthi Panagaris
 Heaven in This Hell (Robo Records, 2013)

With Jimmy Cliff
 Fantastic Plastic People (Artist Network, 2002)

With Bob Dylan
 Knocked Out Loaded (Columbia Records, 1986)

With Martina McBride
 Eleven (Republic Nashville, 2011)

With Katy Perry
 One of the Boys (Capitol Records, 2008)

With Anastacia
 Anastacia (Epic Records, 2004)
 It's a Man's World (BMG, 2012)

With Carina Round
 Slow Motion Addict (Interscope Records, 2007)

With Mick Jagger
 Primitive Cool (Columbia Records, 1987)

With Stevie Nicks
 In Your Dreams (Reprise Records, 2011)
 24 Karat Gold: Songs from the Vault (Reprise Records, 2014)

With Hall & Oates
 Change of Season (Arista Records, 1990)
 Marigold Sky (Push Records, 1997)

With Shania Twain
 Queen of Me (Republic Records, 2023)

With Feargal Sharkey
 Feargal Sharkey (A&M Records, 1985)

With Bryan Ferry
 Frantic (Virgin Records, 2002)
 Olympia (Virgin Records, 2010)

With Sinéad O'Connor
 Faith and Courage (Atlantic Records, 2000)

With Aretha Franklin
 Who's Zoomin' Who? (Arista Records, 1985)

References

External links
 
 

1952 births
Living people
20th-century British guitarists
21st-century British guitarists
Brit Award winners
British synth-pop new wave musicians
English expatriates in the United States
English new wave musicians
Golden Globe Award-winning musicians
Grammy Award winners
Ivor Novello Award winners
Male new wave singers
People educated at Bede Grammar School for Boys
People from Sunderland
Musicians from Tyne and Wear
20th-century squatters
Eurythmics members
English record producers
English male singer-songwriters
English multi-instrumentalists
English male guitarists
English rock guitarists
Lead guitarists
Dave Stewart and the Spiritual Cowboys members
SuperHeavy members
The Tourists members
RCA Records artists
East West Records artists